Malta competed at the 2013 Mediterranean Games in Mersin, Turkey from the 20th to 30 June 2013.

Shooting
Gold: Men Double Trap: William CHETCUTI

Bocce
Silver: Men Bocce Doubles

References
Malta Medals

Nations at the 2013 Mediterranean Games
2013
Mediterranean Games